Rebecca Kalu (born 12 June 1990) represented the Nigeria women's national under-20 football team as a midfielder at the 2008 and 2010 FIFA U-20 Women's World Cups, and was in the Nigeria squad for the 2011 FIFA Women's World Cup. She failed to make an appearance in the tournament. At club level, she played for Piteå IF in 2009 in Sweden.

References

1990 births
Living people
Nigerian women's footballers
Nigeria women's international footballers
Place of birth missing (living people)
2011 FIFA Women's World Cup players
Women's association football midfielders
Damallsvenskan players
Piteå IF (women) players
Nigerian expatriate women's footballers
Nigerian expatriate sportspeople in Sweden
Expatriate women's footballers in Sweden